Capitol Punishment: The Hard Truth About Washington Corruption From America's Most Notorious Lobbyist is a non-fiction 300-page memoir by former American lobbyist Jack Abramoff, published by WNDbooks in November 2011. The book, described as an "account of his political triumphs, serial lawbreaking and unethical conduct" by The Washington Post, details the author's life in Washington as a power broker and lobbyist. In its last chapter, titled "Path to Reform", Abramoff lists a number of proposals to eliminate bribery of government officials.

Writing process 

Abramoff wrote Capitol Punishment in four weeks, as he states, after having served four years in a federal prison for corruption connected to his lobbying. When asked why he wrote the book, he said in an interview: "When I was in prison, I started thinking about how to fix the system that is there. Because, obviously, throwing Jack Abramoff in jail didn't clean up the system", adding "I had something to give back, some way to make some recompense for what I was by telling what is going on in Washington – from the point of view of somebody who rose very high in that industry – and what goes on behind those doors, and how horrible it really is."

Content 
The book details the inner workings of the Washington that Abramoff knew. It discusses Abramoff's relationships with powerful congressional leaders like Tom DeLay and Bob Ney, and shares the names of senators who, according to Abramoff, took tens of thousands of dollars, but offers no significant new details beyond what was known before, and "doesn't help identify the people he corrupted who are still on the Hill", as The Huffington Post notes. Some of the people he accuses of having taken money from his team and clients, particularly members of the Senate Indian Affairs Committee and Democratic Party politicians, have denied the allegations, calling Abramoff "a liar".

The book is meant to expose what Abramoff considers the real problem of the Washington lobby. This real problem, according to Abramoff, is not what is illegal in Washington, but rather what is legal. In the last chapter of the book, Abramoff portrays himself as someone who supports genuine reform. He suggests to shut the "revolving door" between Capitol Hill and the K Street offices of Washington's biggest lobbying firms by banning legislators and their aides for life from becoming lobbyists. He also proposes barring lobbyists from giving gifts to lawmakers, and prohibiting lobbyists and special interest groups from making political donations. In addition to this, he advocates instituting term limits for representatives and senators.

References

External links 
 
After Words interview with Abramoff on Capitol Punishment, January 7, 2012

2011 non-fiction books
American memoirs
American political books